Aomori Wat's is a Japanese professional basketball team located in Aomori, Aomori. The team currently competes in the B.League.

Roster

Notable players
To appear in this section a player must have either:
 Set a club record or won an individual award as a professional player.
 Played at least one official international match for his senior national team or one NBA game at any time.
 Kwame Alexander
 Kyle Barone
 Joe Burton
 Tiny Gallon
 Lakeem Jackson
 Julius Jucikas
 Anthony Kent (es)
 Yūki Kitamuki (fr)
 Gordon Klaiber
 Yoshifumi Nakajima
 Junki Nozato
 Stanley Ocitti
 Jesse Perry
 Gyno Pomare
 Damian Saunders
 Makoto Sawaguchi
 Brandon Sebirumbi
 Daichi Shimoyama
 Kenichi Takahashi
 Kenta Tateyama
 Alan Wiggins
 Yuki Yamaguchi

Coaches

Koju Munakata
Nobunaga Sato
Noriyuki Kitaya
Takeshi Hotta
Fernando Calero Gil
Jumpei Takahara

Arenas

Maeda Arena
Flat Hachinohe
Misawa International Sports Center
Hachinohe City Higashi Gymnasium
Kakuhiro Group Stadium
Goshogawa Citizens Gymnasium
Spocul-in Kuroishi

References

External links

Presentation at Asia-Basket.com

 
Basketball teams in Japan
Sports teams in Aomori (city)
Basketball teams established in 2012
2012 establishments in Japan